ShotSpotter Inc. is a publicly traded, Fremont, California-based company known for its controversial gunfire locator service. ShotSpotter claims it can identify whether or not a gunshot was fired in an area in order to dispatch law enforcement, though researchers have noted concerns about effectiveness, reliability, privacy, and equity. The company has been partnering with cities and police since 1997, and as of 2022 has been utilized by more than 130 cities and law enforcement agencies in the US.

History
ShotSpotter was founded by Robert Showen in the 1990s while he was working for SRI International. He created a company in 1996 and tested prototypes in Redwood City, California. Its early success was described by Wired as being "due to good PR, not good technology." James Beldock joined as CEO in 2003 as a "turnaround specialist"; in 2005 the company merged with Centurist Systems, which was creating acoustic sniper location systems for the military; Centurist held a "deceptively simple patent" for the location algorithm. Centurist's CEO, Scott Manderville, became president of the board.

As of 2021, the acoustic locator technology was installed in 125 cities and 14 campuses, covering 911 square miles. The locators are typically installed at 20–25 sensors per square mile and primarily connected via 4G networks (mostly AT&T and Verizon). In 2020, Chicago was 18% of the company's revenue, and New York City was 15%.

Ralph Clark was named CEO of ShotSpotter in 2010. The company went public in June 2017. The company authorized a stock buyback program in 2019 and bought back $8.3 million by the end of 2020.

The company's gross revenues were $58.2 million in 2021 (increased coverage by 49 square miles and 10 cities), up from $45.7 million in 2020 (increased coverage by 49 square miles and 10 cities) and from $40.8 million in 2019 (increased coverage by 82 square miles and 6 cities). The company had a net loss of $4.4 million in 2021, in part from nonrenewal of contracts and increases in legal costs, PR from Trident DMG, and lobbying.

Toronto, Ontario has declined to use the technology, as the Ministry of the Solicitor General (Ontario) believes it violates Section 8 of the Canadian Charter of Rights and Freedoms. The company previously provided indoor gunfire locator technology, but discontinued it in 2018.

ShotSpotter illegally lobbied the city of Oakland, California in 2014 and received a $5000 fine. In 2023, Portland, Oregon's auditor began investigating the company for similar lobbying violations.

Studies
A June 2021 study in the Journal of Experimental Criminology stated the system "may be of little benefit to police agencies with a pre-existing high call volume. Our results indicate no reductions in serious violent crimes, yet [ShotSpotter] increases demands on police resources." An October 2021 paper in the Journal of Urban Health, studying the longitudinal effects of ShotSpotter over a 17 year period, found "implementing ShotSpotter technology has no significant impact on firearm-related homicides or arrest outcomes. Policy solutions may represent a more cost-effective measure to reduce urban firearm violence."

The NYU School of Law Policing Project published a paper in 2021, "Measuring the effects of ShotSpotter on Gunfire in St. Louis County, Mo". The paper indicated a significant drop in gun violence in the area. However, the paper also discloses that ShotSpotter "has provided the Policing Project with unrestricted funding".

Jennifer Doleac told Voice of San Diego that ShotSpotter "resisted attempts (by me and others) to do a rigorous evaluation of its impacts", noting "they've clearly found that they can get cities to sign their contracts without such evidence."

Accuracy
As of 2021, ShotSpotter evidence has been used in 190 court cases. ShotSpotter has admitted it manually alters the computer-calculated evidence "on a semiregular basis", and it has never been independently tested, leading to doubts on its accuracy. Vice's Motherboard noted that ShotSpotter "frequently modify alerts at the request of police departments." Associated Press also noted their "methods for identifying gunshots aren't always guided solely by the technology."

While the company claims a 97% accuracy, the MacArthur Justice Center studied over 40,000 dispatches in an under 2-year period in Chicago and found that 89% of dispatches resulted in no gun-related crime, and 86% resulted in no crime at all. These results were backed up by a subsequent report by the Chicago Inspector General, which also found that police officers changed their practice by stopping and searching people for no other reason than that they were in a place known to have many ShotSpotter alerts. ShotSpotter's CEO described an earlier 80% accuracy rate as "basically our subscription warranty," but employee Paul Greene said "Our guarantee was put together by our sales and marketing department, not our engineers."

The ACLU has raised questions about privacy and surveillance, as the detectors keep hours or days of continuous audio. This audio has been admitted as evidence in at least one trial and rejected under a Massachusetts wiretapping law in a 2017 case. When Forbes sent public records requests to agencies in 2016, ShotSpotter sent a memo to all of its customers, detailing how they should deny or redact the requests.

The Associated Press reviewed a confidential operations document that indicated 10% of the algorithm's decisions were overridden by a human.

Additionally, the sensors are disproportionately placed in minority communities, leading to more interactions with police, often from false alerts from pneumatic nail guns, jackhammers, and even hammers.

Individual cases

In April 2017, ShotSpotter was able to locate mass-shooter Kori Ali Muhammad, enabling police to apprehend him within minutes.

The Rochester Police Department in New York use ShotSpotter. In 2017, officer Joseph Ferrigno shot Silvon Simmons in the back. Accounts between Ferrigno and Simmons vary, but ShotSpotter initially detected the gunshots as a helicopter. The company reclassified it as three gunshots "per the customer's instruction," then revised it to four shots. Later the company's employee Paul Greene "was asked by the Rochester Police department to essentially search and see if there were more shots fired than ShotSpotter picked up," so it was revised to five gunshots, which put it in alignment with Ferrigno's claims. The jury didn't believe ShotSpotter's evidence, and Judge Ciaccio overturned a gun possession charge, describing the ShotSpotter evidence as flawed. Simmons filed a civil lawsuit against ShotSpotter in 2017, which is still open as of 2021.

Greene also testified in a 2018 case in Chicago where ShotSpotter initially reported two gunshots. On request of the Chicago Police Department, he re-analyzed and found seven gunshots. This matched the police department's account and was not supported by video or bullet casing evidence.

Another case of reclassification occurred in 2020 with the arrest of a Chicago man for the shooting murder of Safarain Herring. ShotSpotter initially classified the sound as a firework, but a ShotSpotter employee changed it to gunfire a minute later, and later changed the calculated location to match the defendant's known location — over a mile away. A public defender in the case filed a Frye motion to examine the ShotSpotter forensic method, and the prosecution withdrew the evidence to avoid scrutinizing it. The MacArthur Center along with Lucy Parsons Labs filed an amicus curiae in the case, supporting the Frye hearing, noting the false positives, the disproportionate deployment, and that "ShotSpotter provides a false technological justification for overpolicing." The defendant spent 11 months in jail before being released in 2021 when his case was dismissed for insufficient evidence.

A ShotSpotter report of shots fired was the impetus for police response which resulted in the March 2021 shooting death of a 13-year-old boy by the Chicago Police Department.

In New Bedford, Massachusetts, the gunshot sensors recorded parts of a conversation, leading to concerns that it violates Fourth Amendment rights. Remarking on these privacy concerns, in 2015 then-NYPD commissioner William Bratton said "the advocates have to get a life." Bratton had been on ShotSpotter's Board of Directors before then, and rejoined it in 2017.

In July 2022, the MacArthur Justice Center brought a class action lawsuit against the City of Chicago, the Chicago Police Department, and several individual police officers for constitutional violations in connection with the use of ShotSpotter. The lawsuit alleges that more than 90% of the time police respond to a ShotSpotter alert they find no indication of a gun-related incident and instead use the alerts to justify scores of illegal stops and arrests. The lawsuit also alleges that Chicago's ShotSpotter policy is racially discriminatory because the system was only implemented in areas with the highest concentration of Black and Latino residents.

Part of ShotSpotter's appeal to privacy is that police do not know the installed locations, which theoretically could allow police to acquire conversations from the ShotSpotter microphones. Bloomberg News reported, however, that not only were the addresses given to the New York Police Department, but they relied on the police to help lobby for their installations. NYPD also stated they have also escorted ShotSpotter site survey teams.

ShotSpotter was activated for a shooting at the house of New Mexico Senator Linda M. Lopez; police were dispatched but did not find evidence.

Design 
ShotSpotter's gunshot detection system utilizes a series of sensors to capture loud, impulsive sounds. When such sounds are identified, sensors send data to a pair of algorithms responsible for identifying a location and determining if the event can be classified as potential gunfire. Employees at the company are charged with confirming incidents and notifying local police. 

Although it is designed to be just an investigative tool for the police, it has also been used for actual primary evidence in trials, leading to criticism about ShotSpotter's effectiveness beyond its primary purpose.

Installations

Current

 Mobile, Alabama
 Antioch, California (4 sq mi, $1.4 million sole-source 5 year contract)
 Bakersfield, California
 Fresno, California
 Oakland, California
 Pasadena, California
 Sacramento, California
 San Diego, California (since 2016)
 Hartford, Connecticut
 Denver, Colorado
 District of Columbia
 Miami, Florida
 Bibb County, Georgia (7 square miles, since 2022, $2 million)
 Savannah, Georgia (since 2014)
 Chicago, Illinois (over 100 square miles, 3-year $33 million contract)
 Peoria, Illinois
 Louisville, Kentucky
 New Bedford, Massachusetts
 Pittsfield, Massachusetts
 Springfield, Massachusetts
 Detroit, Michigan ($7 million phased installation in 2022, 32 sq mi)
 Omaha, Nebraska
 Las Vegas, Nevada
 Albuquerque, New Mexico (since 2020)
 New York City
 Rochester, New York
 Syracuse, New York 
 Durham, North Carolina (pilot began in 2022, 3 square miles, $197k one-year contract)
 Cincinnati, Ohio
 Columbus, Ohio
 Mansfield, Ohio
 Youngstown, Ohio
 Warrensville Heights, Ohio
 Cleveland, Ohio ($2.8 million expansion to 13 sq mi in 2022 using American Rescue Plan Act funding)
 Toledo, Ohio
 Pittsburgh, Pennsylvania
 Houston, Texas (10 sq mi, $74,000 per square mile per year)
 Virginia Beach, Virginia
 Milwaukee, Wisconsin (installed in 2010; contract renewal in March 2023)

Pending

 Escambia County, Florida
 Holyoke, Massachusetts (2 square miles, $150k/year)
 Sparks, Nevada
 Buffalo, New York
 Fayetteville, North Carolina (one year, $217k, 3 sq mi, starting 2022)
 Portland, Oregon: tabled to allow for other bids
 York, Pennsylvania (had used it previously, in 2023 the police captain said "it was terrible, it was awful")
 Seattle, Washington: Mayor Bruce Harrell proposed spending $1 million on ShotSpotter in 2022, but in November 2022, the city council approved a budget that did not include such funding. Budget chair Teresa Mosqueda cited issues with the technology identified by other cities as the reason it was not being pursued.

Former

 Atlanta, Georgia (cancelled after trials in 2018 and 2022)
 New Orleans, Louisiana (removed in 2013)
 Trenton, New Jersey
 Charlotte, North Carolina (began in 2012, cancelled in 2016)
 Dayton, Ohio (3 square miles, started in 2019, cancelled in 2022)
 Canton, Ohio (switched to Wi-Fiber detection in 2019)
 Cape Town, South Africa (2016-2019)
 San Antonio, Texas (cancelled in 2017)

References

External links
 

2017 initial public offerings
Companies based in Fremont, California
Companies listed on the Nasdaq
Technology companies based in the San Francisco Bay Area
Security technology
Types of policing
Surveillance
Law enforcement
Crime prevention
Automatic identification and data capture